Community Broadcasters, LLC is a Watertown, New York based radio holding group that owns radio stations in its own market and surrounding areas.  It was founded by media executives Bruce Mittman and Jim Leven, and started out in 2006 by buying stations owned by Clancy-Mance Communications, Inc.

Station list
All in the state of New York:

In South Carolina:

Former stations
The Elmira and Olean stations were originally acquired from Backyard Broadcasting after that company mostly exited radio in 2013. They were spun off to Seven Mountains Media in 2019.

The Florida stations were sold to JVC Broadcasting effective February 1, 2021.

Community Broadcasters surrendered the license for WDKD to the Federal Communications Commission on November 16, 2021.

References

Companies established in 2006
Companies based in Jefferson County, New York
Radio broadcasting companies of the United States